The Cortlandt Town Center (formerly known as the Westchester Mall) is a large retail power center located in Cortlandt, New York. The New York Times called it "the main shopping area of the town of Cortlandt Manor" in 2003. The current incarnation (and name) was founded in 1997 from buildings that made up the mostly enclosed Westchester Mall built in 1975. Anchor stores include Walmart, The Home Depot, Best Buy, Acme Markets, Barnes & Noble, PetSmart, Michaels, Old Navy, Bed Bath & Beyond, Marshall's, and DSW. It also contains a 12-screen United Artists Theater, GameStop, DressBarn, Five Below, Mattress Firm, the Mohegan Lake post office and several restaurants including McDonald's, Applebee's, Panera Bread, Subway, Five Guys, Emperor's Garden, Mia's Pizza and Moe's Southwest Grill. There are 3 vacant spaces last left by Modell's Sporting Goods, Pier 1 Imports, and OfficeMax.

On March 11, 2020, it was announced that Modell's Sporting Goods would close as part of a plan to close all stores nationwide after filing for Chapter 11 bankruptcy.

On May 19, 2020, it was announced that Pier 1 Imports would be closing as part of a plan to close all locations nationwide.

On January 19, 2023, it was announced that Regal Cinemas would close as part of a plan to close 39 theaters nationwide.

References

Shopping malls in New York (state)
Demolished shopping malls in the United States
Shopping malls established in 1975
Power centers (retail) in the United States